Gaël Monfils defeated Karen Khachanov in the final, 6–4, 6–4 to win the men's singles tennis title at the 2022 Adelaide International 1.

Andrey Rublev was the reigning champion from when the tournament was last held in 2020, but chose not to participate this year.

Corentin Moutet's default marks the 19th consecutive year since 2004 with at least one default between the ATP and the Challenger tours.

Seeds 
The top four seeds received a bye into the second round.

Draw

Finals

Top half

Bottom half

Qualifying

Seeds

Qualifiers

Qualifying draw

First qualifier

Second qualifier

Third qualifier

Fourth qualifier

See also  
 2022 Adelaide International 2

References

External links
 Main draw
 Qualifying draw

2022 Adelaide International
2022 ATP Tour
Adelaide